DeSoto Parish (French: Paroisse DeSoto) is a parish located in the U.S. state of Louisiana. The parish was formed in 1843. At the 2020 U.S. census, the population was 26,812. Its parish seat is Mansfield. DeSoto Parish is part of the Shreveport–Bossier City metropolitan statistical area.

History
It is a typical misconception that the parish was named after Hernando de Soto, the Spaniard who explored the future southeastern United States and discovered and named the Mississippi River.  The parish was in fact named after the unrelated Marcel DeSoto, who led the first group of European settlers there, to a settlement historically known as Bayou Pierre.  The parish's name is also commonly misspelled following the explorer's name as "De Soto Parish," but it is properly spelled following the settler's name as "DeSoto Parish."

Geography

Major highways
  Interstate 49
  Future Interstate 69
  U.S. Highway 84
  U.S. Highway 171
  U.S. Highway 371
  Louisiana Highway 5

Adjacent parishes
 Caddo Parish  (north)
 Red River Parish  (east)
 Natchitoches Parish  (southeast)
 Sabine Parish  (south)
 Shelby County, Texas  (southwest)
 Panola County, Texas  (west)

National protected area
 Red River National Wildlife Refuge (part)

Communities

City 
 Mansfield (parish seat and largest municipality)

Towns
 Keachi
 Logansport
 Stonewall

Villages
 Grand Cane
 Longstreet
 South Mansfield
 Stanley

Unincorporated areas

Census-designated places 
 Frierson
 Gloster

Unincorporated communities 
 Carmel
 Hunter
 Kingston
 Naborton
 Pelican

Demographics

As of the 2020 United States census, there were 26,812 people, 10,821 households, and 7,254 families residing in the parish. At the 2019 American Community Survey, there were 10,821 households.

In 2019, the racial and ethnic makeup of the parish was 58.8% non-Hispanic or Latino white, 35.3% Black or African American, 0.9% American Indian and Alaska Native, 0.1% Asian, <0.0% Native Hawaiian and other Pacific Islander, 0.1% some other race, 1.9% two or more races, and 2.9% Hispanic or Latin American of any race.

There were 10,821 households at the 2019 census estimates, and the home-ownership rate was 71.3%. Of the 7,716 owner-occupied units, 3,917 were married couples living together, 365 male households with no female present, and 896 female households with no male present. There was a 17.1% vacancy rate in the parish. The average family size was 3.07, and the average household size was 2.50.

In the parish, 75.5% were aged 18 and older, and 17.2% were aged 65 and older; the median age was 39.3, and 6.5% were aged 5 and under. Approximately 0.8% of the population were foreign-born, and 2.1% spoke a language other than English at home.

The median income for a household in the parish was $46,006; families had a median income of $56,323, married couples had a median income of $78,090, and non-family households had a median income of $25,314. An estimated 22% of the parish lived at or below the poverty line, and 30.6% of people aged under 18 were at or below the poverty line.

Education 
Public schools in DeSoto Parish are operated by the DeSoto Parish School Board. It is in the service area of Bossier Parish Community College.

Notable people
 Larry Bagley (born 1949), incoming Republican member of the Louisiana House of Representatives for Caddo, Desoto, and Sabine parishes
 Terry Bradshaw (born 1948), Hall of Fame professional football player, sportscaster, singer, and actor
 Richard Burford (born 1946), current Louisiana state representative
 Vida Blue (born 1949), professional baseball player
 C.L. Bryant (born 1956), Baptist minister and radio talk show host
 Riemer Calhoun (1909–1994), state senator from 1944 to 1952 for DeSoto and Caddo parishes
 Joe T. Cawthorn (1911–1967), state senator from 1940 to 1944 for DeSoto and Caddo parishes
 Sherri Smith Cheek Buffington (born 1966), Louisiana State Senator
 Joe Henry Cooper (1920–1980), Louisiana state representative
 Kenny Ray Cox (born 1957), Louisiana state representative and former United States Army officer
 Milton Joseph Cunningham (1842–1916), Natchitoches and New Orleans lawyer, state senator from Natchitoches and DeSoto parishes from 1880 to 1884; state attorney general for three nonconsecutive terms ending in 1900, born in what became DeSoto Parish
 George Dement (1922–2014), mayor of Bossier City
 John H. Eastman (1861–1938), mayor of Shreveport
 Joseph Barton Elam (1821–1885), United States Representative from Louisiana's 4th congressional district
 William J. Fleniken (1908–1979), U.S. attorney and state 1st Judicial District Court judge in Shreveport; born in DeSoto Parish
 William Pike Hall, Sr. (1896–1945), state senator for Caddo and DeSoto parishes, 1924–1932, Shreveport attorney
 John Spencer Hardy (1913–2012), United States Air Force lieutenant general
 Albert Lewis (1960-), professional football player
 Walter M. Lowrey (1921–1980), historian at Centenary College of Louisiana
 Curtis W. McCoy, mayor of Mansfield
 Garnie W. McGinty (1900–1984), historian at Louisiana Tech University and school principal
 Mack Charles Reynolds (1935–1991), professional football player
 Jayson Richardson, elected Sheriff of DeSoto Parish as a No Party candidate in 2018
 B. H. "Johnny" Rogers (1905–1977), politician
 C. O. Simpkins, Sr. (1925–2019 from Mansfield), African-American state representative, dentist, and civil rights activist in Shreveport
 O.C. Smith (1932–2001), singer

Politics

See also

 National Register of Historic Places listings in DeSoto Parish, Louisiana

References

Further reading
 De Vries, Mark Leon, “Between Equal Justice and Racial Terror: Freedpeople and the District Court of DeSoto Parish during Reconstruction,” Louisiana History, 56 (Summer 2015), 261–93.
 Water Resources of De Soto Parish, Louisiana United States Geological Survey

External links
 

 
Louisiana parishes
Parishes in Shreveport – Bossier City metropolitan area
1843 establishments in Louisiana
Populated places established in 1843